Spencer Marsh may refer to:

Spencer M. Marsh (1864–1932), Wisconsin State Senator
Spencer S. Marsh (fl. 1830–1875), judge and North Carolina State Senator